The  are the rest areas along the Nakasendō, which ran from Nihonbashi in Edo (modern-day Tokyo) to Sanjō Ōhashi in Kyoto.

Stations of the Nakasendō

The sixty-nine stations of the Nakasendō, in addition to the starting and ending locations (which are shared with the Tōkaidō), are listed below in order. The stations are divided by their present-day prefecture and include the name of their present-day city/town/village/district.

Tokyo
Starting Location: Nihonbashi (Chūō-ku)
1. Itabashi-shuku (Itabashi)

Saitama Prefecture
2. Warabi-shuku (Warabi)
3. Urawa-shuku (Urawa-ku, Saitama)
4. Ōmiya-shuku (Ōmiya-ku, Saitama)
5. Ageo-shuku (Ageo)
6. Okegawa-shuku (Okegawa)
7. Kōnosu-shuku (Kōnosu)
8. Kumagai-shuku (Kumagaya)
9. Fukaya-shuku (Fukaya)
10. Honjō-shuku (Honjō)

Gunma Prefecture
11. Shinmachi-shuku (Takasaki)
12. Kuragano-shuku (Takasaki) (also part of the Nikkō Reiheishi Kaidō)
13. Takasaki-shuku (Takasaki)
14. Itahana-shuku (Annaka)
15. Annaka-shuku (Annaka)
16. Matsuida-shuku (Annaka)
17. Sakamoto-shuku (Annaka)

Nagano Prefecture
18. Karuisawa-shuku (Karuizawa, Kitasaku District)
19. Kutsukake-shuku (Karuizawa, Kitasaku District)
20. Oiwake-shuku (Karuizawa, Kitasaku District)
21. Otai-shuku (Miyota, Kitasaku District)
22. Iwamurada-shuku (Saku)
23. Shionada-shuku (Saku)
24. Yawata-shuku (Saku)
25. Mochizuki-shuku (Saku)
26. Ashida-shuku (Tateshina, Kitasaku District)
27. Nagakubo-shuku (Nagawa, Chiisagata District)
28. Wada-shuku (Nagawa, Chiisagata District)
29. Shimosuwa-shuku (Shimosuwa, Suwa District) (also part of the Kōshū Kaidō)
30. Shiojiri-shuku (Shiojiri) (also part of the Shio no Michi)
31. Seba-juku (Shiojiri)
32. Motoyama-juku (Shiojiri)
33. Niekawa-juku (Shiojiri)
34. Narai-juku (Shiojiri)
35. Yabuhara-juku (Kiso (village), Kiso District)
36. Miyanokoshi-juku (Kiso (town), Kiso District)
37. Fukushima-juku (Kiso (town), Kiso District)
38. Agematsu-juku (Agematsu, Kiso District)
39. Suhara-juku (Ōkuwa, Kiso District)
40. Nojiri-juku (Ōkuwa, Kiso District)
41. Midono-juku (Nagiso, Kiso District)
42. Tsumago-juku (Nagiso, Kiso District)

Gifu Prefecture
43. Magome-juku (Nakatsugawa)
44. Ochiai-juku (Nakatsugawa)
45. Nakatsugawa-juku (Nakatsugawa)
46. Ōi-juku (Ena)
47. Ōkute-juku (Mizunami)
48. Hosokute-juku (Mizunami)
49. Mitake-juku (Mitake, Kani District)
50. Fushimi-juku (Mitake, Kani District)
51. Ōta-juku (Minokamo)
52. Unuma-juku (Kakamigahara)
53. Kanō-juku (Gifu)
54. Gōdo-juku (Gifu)
55. Mieji-juku (Mizuho)
56. Akasaka-juku (Ōgaki)
57. Tarui-juku (Tarui, Fuwa District)
58. Sekigahara-juku (Sekigahara, Fuwa District)
59. Imasu-juku (Sekigahara, Fuwa District)

Shiga Prefecture
60. Kashiwabara-juku (Maibara)
61. Samegai-juku (Maibara)
62. Banba-juku (Maibara)
63. Toriimoto-juku (Hikone)
64. Takamiya-juku (Hikone)
65. Echigawa-juku (Aishō, Echi District)
66. Musa-juku (Ōmihachiman)
67. Moriyama-juku (Moriyama)
68. Kusatsu-juku (Kusatsu) (also part of the Tōkaidō)
69. Ōtsu-juku (Ōtsu) (also part of the Tōkaidō)

Kyoto Prefecture
Ending Location: Sanjō Ōhashi (Higashiyama-ku, Kyoto)

Ai no Shuku
Ai no shuku (intermediate area) are intermediate rest areas along Japan's historical routes. Because they are not official post stations, normal travelers were generally not allowed to stay at them. Here are some of the ai no shuku along the Nakasendō:
Fukiage-shuku, between Kōnosu-juku and Kumagai-juku (Kōnosu, Saitama Prefecture)
Motai-shuku, between Mochizuki-shuku and Ashida-shuku (Saku, Nagano Prefecture)
Shinkanō-juku, between Unuma-juku and Kanō-juku (Kakamigahara, Gifu Prefecture)

See also 
Edo Five Routes
53 Stations of the Tōkaidō
44 Stations of the Kōshū Kaidō
27 Stations of the Ōshū Kaidō
21 Stations of the Nikkō Kaidō
Other Routes
17 Stations of the Hokkoku Kaidō
11 Stations of the Kisoji
35 Stations of the Mikuni Kaidō

References

 
Japan transport-related lists